Caligo telamonius memnon, commonly known as the giant owl or pale owl, is a subspecies of butterfly of the family Nymphalidae. This  subspecies can be found in rainforests and secondary forests from Mexico to the Amazon rainforest in South America.

The wingspan is usually from 115 to 130 mm, but can reach 150 mm.

The larvae feed on Musa and Heliconia species and can be a pest for banana cultivation. Adults feed on juices of rotting fruit.

Gallery

References

Caligo
Taxa named by Baron Cajetan von Felder
Taxa named by Rudolf Felder
Butterflies described in 1867